Nir David  (lit. David's Meadow) is a kibbutz in the Beit She'an Valley in northern Israel. Founded on 10 December 1936 as Tel Amal, the first of the tower and stockade settlements, it falls under the jurisdiction of Valley of Springs Regional Council.

History
Nir David was founded on the 10 December 1936, under the name of Tel Amal. It was established as the first tower and stockade settlement (and the first kibbutz) in the Beit She'an Valley.

In the 1940s, the kibbutz was renamed Nir David in honor of David Wolffsohn, second president of the World Zionist Organization. The communal dining room and two children's homes were designed by Zeev Rechter, architect of some of Israel's most iconic buildings. A group of Holocaust survivors joined the kibbutz in the 1940s.

Nir David uses land that traditionally belonged to the depopulated Palestinian village of Al-Sakhina.

In the 1990s, Nir David developed a tourism industry based around the Asi river, which flows through it. Around 2010, the kibbutz fenced off the community and installed a locked steel gate at the  entrance, after protest from people, who wanted access to the scenic Asi river. In 2021, the kibbutz claimed that 40% of its population was Mizrahi.

Economy
The kibbutz's main income is from agriculture, e.g., field crops, orchards, and fish. Nir David Fish Breeding Farms has developed Tilapia strains with unique properties. The kibbutz's "Nirotek" factory produces self adhesive and carbonless copy paper, and a metal factory exports horticultural vehicles and tools.

Landmarks

 "Gan Hashlosha" - A semi-natural water park.
 "Gan-Garoo" - Australian zoo, which features Australian marsupial wildlife such as kangaroos and koala
 Village Inn - Lodging in Nir-David on the banks of the Asi river.
 Guest ranch - a relatively large horse ranch offering horseback training for children and adults, from basic riding to competitive, and occasionally hosts equestrian show jumping competitions.
 Holtzer Sport Center - A modern sport complex which includes a 25 m. swimming pool, basketball court and a multipurpose sports auditorium.

Notable people

 Shlomo Gur (1913-2000), founding 
 Gabi Teichner (born 1945), basketball player

See also
 Tourism in Israel

References

External links
 Official website
 Nir David Metal Works 
 Nir David Tourism 
 Gan Hashlosha

Kibbutzim
Kibbutz Movement
Populated places established in 1936
1936 establishments in Mandatory Palestine
Populated places in Northern District (Israel)